Hrabove or Hrabové can mean:

Slovakia 
 Hrabové (Slovakia), a populated place in Slovakia

Ukraine 
 Hrabove, Donetsk Oblast, a village in Donetsk Oblast, Ukraine
 Hrabove, Odessa Oblast, a village in Odessa Oblast, Ukraine
 Hrabove, Shatsk Raion, a village in Shatsk Raion, Volyn Oblast, Ukraine
 Hrabove, Stara Vyzhivka Raion, a village in Stara Vyzhivka Raion, Volyn Oblast, Ukraine

See also
 The same name may be transliterated differently from different native languages:
 Hrabove (disambiguation)
 Grabovo (disambiguation)
 Grabowo (disambiguation)

Hrabovec (disambiguation)